The Ulster Intermediate Club Hurling Championship is an annual hurling tournament played between the intermediate hurling clubs in Ulster. Teams usually qualify for this tournament by winning the intermediate hurling championship in their county. In the cases of Tyrone and some other weaker counties, the winners of their senior championship will compete in this competition, rather than the Ulster Senior Club Hurling Championship. The winners compete in the semi-final of the All-Ireland Intermediate Club Hurling Championship.

Teams

Qualification

Roll of Honour

List of Finals

 2019 Naomh Eanna won 1-0 on penalties

References

2011 Final report

2